Five Island Lake is a lake in the Halifax Regional Municipality in Nova Scotia, Canada. It is situated west of the city of Halifax and east of St. Margaret's Bay.

References
Explore HRM
 Five Island Lake

Communities in Halifax, Nova Scotia
General Service Areas in Nova Scotia